Garoute is a surname. Notable people with the surname include:

Alice Garoute (1874–1950), Haitian suffragist and women's rights advocate
Charles H. Garoute (1854–1910), American attorney and judge
Jean-Claude Garoute (1935–2006), Haitian painter and sculptor

See also
Garouste